Pygocentrus cariba or black spot piranha is a species of piranha native to the Orinoco River basin lowlands and the Llanos region in Venezuela and Colombia. It is popular as a game fish.

They are a carnivorous species, that feed on a wide variety of fish, carrion, invertebrates, and other aquatic animals. 

The name Cariba means cannibal in native language, and comes from the people of the Island Caribs who had a reputation as warriors who raided neighboring islands, and practiced cannibalism, according to the Spanish conquistadors. This species has very high propensity for cannibalism among its species.

References

Piranhas
Fish of South America
Serrasalmidae
Taxa named by Alexander von Humboldt
Fish described in 1821